Roderick Thomas Berringer (Rod) Hall  (27 April 1951 – 21 May 2004) was a  British  literary agent who represented several successful writers.

Having worked for London agency A.P. Watt, he set up his own, the Rod Hall Agency , in 1997.

Hall was found dead, with multiple stab wounds, chained to a radiator, in his Southwark apartment. In 2005 Usman Durrani, a 22 year old student at Edinburgh University was convicted of Hall's murder and sentenced to life in prison.

Following his death, the films Driving Lessons and Imagine Me & You as well as the stage play Mercury Fur were dedicated to him.

Clients
Hall's agency represented more than 60 writers, including:
Simon Beaufoy (wrote The Full Monty and Slumdog Millionaire)
Jeremy Brock (wrote Mrs. Brown)
Lee Hall (wrote Billy Elliot)
Liz Lochhead (Scottish poet)
Martin McDonagh (playwright)
Philip Ridley (playwright, screenwriter, director)
Richard Smith (wrote Trauma)
Juliette Towhidi (wrote Calendar Girls)
Simon Nye (wrote the television show Men Behaving Badly).

References

External links
BBC report of Hall's death

1951 births
2004 deaths
2004 murders in the United Kingdom
British murder victims
Literary agents
People murdered in London
2004 in London